Vilémov is a municipality and village in Chomutov District in the Ústí nad Labem Region of the Czech Republic. It has about 600 inhabitants.

Administrative parts
Villages of Blov, Vinaře and Zahořany are administrative parts of Vilémov.

References

Villages in Chomutov District